The Home at Hong Kong is a 1983 Hong Kong drama film directed by King Hoi Lam and starring Andy Lau.

Plot
Alan Wong (Andy Lau) is a Hong Kong youth who is bent to climb up the social ladder. With the help of a foreign businessman's mistress and mixed ethnicity woman Erica (Carroll Gordon), he joins a real estate company and he knows how to grasp on to opportunities and gets into high position. Later he meets Cheung Ting Ting (Chu Hoi Ling), a Mainland Chinese girl who illegally came to Hong Kong and sees her pities her and also falls in love in her. When real estate falls into low tide, many foreign businessmen leaves Hong Kong while Alan and Erica refuses to immigrate overseas. Out of jealousy, Erica informs the police that Ting is an illegally immigrant and she suicides forever. Alan and Ting disguise as Vietnamese refugees to escape however Ting refuses to do this. Uncle Fu (Ku Feng),  a watchman who always wished to die in his ancestry home loses his life while helping Ting escape. Another youth, Lee Kin Fai's (Newton Lai) girlfriend, due to her family's eagerness to immigrate, was married to a cabaret manager who helps her family to Hong Kong. Fai loses his self-esteem and loses sanity after being injured in a boxing match.

Cast
Andy Lau as Alan
Chu Hoi Ling as Cheung Ting Ting
Ku Feng as Uncle Fu
Carroll Gordon as Erica
Isabella Kau as Hung
Newton Lai as Lee Kin Fai
Ng Wui as Ting's uncle
Chui Yee as Ting's aunt
Leung Hak Shun as Anderson's company director
Wong Hung as Property Speculator
Lee Chuen Sing as Cosmetic sales trainer
Diego Swing as Erica's party host
Eric Berman as Anderson
Pak Sha Lik as Man at underground fight
Wong Chi Wai as Underground fighter
Chan Ling Wai as Underground fighter
Pomson Shi as Boxing referee
Lui Tat as Watchman
Yat Poon Chai as Policeman
Luk Ying Hong as Policeman

Box office
The film grossed HK$4,830,255 at the Hong Kong box office during its theatrical run from 9 to 31 August 1983 in Hong Kong.

See also
Andy Lau filmography

External links

The Home at Hong Kong at Hong Kong Cinemagic

1983 films
1983 drama films
Hong Kong drama films
1980s Cantonese-language films
Golden Harvest films
Films set in Hong Kong
Films shot in Hong Kong
1980s Hong Kong films